Anselmo Andrade is a village on São Tomé Island in the nation of São Tomé and Príncipe. Its population is 294 (2012 census).

References

Populated places in Cantagalo District